Teriitaria II or Teri'itari'a II, later known as Pōmare Vahine and Ari'ipaea Vahine, baptized Taaroamaiturai ( – 1858), became Queen of Tahiti when she married King Pōmare II and later, she ruled as Queen of Huahine and Maiao in the Society Islands.

Teriitaria was the eldest child of King Tamatoa III of Raiatea and Tura’iari’i Ehevahine, a member of the royal family of Huahine. In 1809, Tamatoa arranged for the marriage of Teriitaria and her sister, Teriʻitoʻoterai Teremoemoe, to their widowed second cousin, Pōmare II of Tahiti. Teriitaria became Queen of Huahine in 1815, but did not govern it during the first decades of her rule. In 1815, she fought in the Battle of Te Feipī, which consolidated her husband's rule. Teriitaria had no children with Pōmare II, but Pōmare fathered the next two Tahitian monarchs, Pōmare III (r. 1821–1827) and Pōmare IV (r. 1827–1877), by Teremoemoe. Pōmare II died in 1821, and Teriitaria and Teremoemoe served as regents for Pōmare III and (after his death in 1827) Pōmare IV.

Teriitaria was removed from the regency in 1828, but continued to have an influential role in Tahiti. She led the Tahitian forces in the Taiarapu rebellion of 1832. She accompanied her niece, Pōmare IV, into exile on Raiatea during the Franco-Tahitian War (1844–1847). Teriitaria repelled a French invasion force at the Battle of Maeva in 1846, which secured the independence of the Leeward Islands. She was deposed in Huahine in 1852 or 1854, and she died in 1858 at Papeete, Tahiti.

Biography

Birth and family 
In 1768, the islands of Raiatea and Tahaa were conquered by the warrior chief Puni of Faanui on Bora Bora and later ruled by his nephew Tapoa I until the end of the eighteenth-century. While still retaining their esteem because of their chiefly rank, the Tamatoa family, which Teriitaria II belonged to, had lost all secular power and had been displaced for half a century on Raiatea. Thus, the Tamatoa family resided on Huahine where the chief U'uru had fled during Puni's conquest. The Tamatoa line of Raiatea was traditionally considered one of the highest ranking lineages of chiefs. It was connected by marriage and adoption to the hereditary chiefs of the other Society Islands of Tahiti, Moorea, Huahine, Maiao, Tahaa, Bora Bora, and Maupiti. Raiatea and the temple complex of Taputapuatea marae at Opoa were considered the religious center of Eastern Polynesia and the birthplace of the cult of the war deity, 'Oro.

Teriitaria was born around 1790. As the eldest daughter of the family, she held special status since Tahitian society was organised as a matrilineality and therefore traditional titles were passed down by the first-born daughters. Her father was U'uru's son, Tamatoa III, the Ariʻi rahi (King) of Raiatea. The ariʻi class were the ruling caste of Tahitian society with both secular and religious powers over the common people. Her mother was Tura’iari’i Ehevahine, the daughter of Queen Tehaʻapapa I of Huahine, who was ruling when Captain James Cook visited the Society Islands as part of his first voyage in 1769. Her younger siblings included brother Tamatoa IV and sisters Teriʻitoʻoterai Teremoemoe, Temari'i Ma'ihara, and Teihotu Ta'avea. Teriitaria shared her name with her half-uncle, King Teriʻitaria I, who was ruling Huahine when Cook brought the Tahitian explorer Omai back to the islands from Europe on his third voyage in 1777.

Tahitian names were rooted in land and titles. In the Tahitian language, Teri'i is a contraction of Te Ari'i, meaning the "sovereign" or "chief". The name Teri'itari'a translated literally as "Carried-sovereign". Ari'ipaea (a name she later adopted) means "Sovereign-reserved" or "Sovereign-elect" while Pōmare (a name she later carried, courtesy of her marriage) means "night cougher" with Vahine meaning "woman".

Marriage to Pōmare II 

During the late 1700s and the early 1800s, Pōmare I had established the Kingdom of Tahiti through the consolidation of traditional titles and the military advantage of Western weapons provided by explorers and traders such as Captain Cook. Protestant missionaries from the London Missionary Society (LMS) settled in Matavai Bay in 1797 under the protection of Pōmare I, although he did not officially convert to the new faith. His successor Pōmare II saw this legacy unravel because of internal rivalries between the Pōmare regime and other chiefly families and the fear of foreign influence subverting the traditional Tahitian religion. The district chiefs of Tahiti had revolted, evicted the missionaries and thrown off the rule of the Pōmare family by 1808. Pōmare II and his followers fled into exile to his territorial possessions on the neighbouring island of Moorea after his war party was defeated in December 1808.

Pōmare II's union with his first wife Tetua remained childless since both were followers of the Arioi, a religious order that worshipped 'Oro and practiced infanticide. Tetua died following an abortion in 1806. Around November 1808, Itia, Pōmare II's mother, sought to cement an alliance between the Pōmare dynasty and the established Tamatoa line of Raiatea. The alliance also was strategically important for the exiled king, who needed military assistance to reconquer Tahiti. It is said that the ship bearing Teriitaria landed on Moorea a little after the one bearing her younger sister Teriʻitoʻoterai Teremoemoe and that Pomare fell in love with the younger sister. Teriitaria was described as having less feminine features than her fair and elegant younger sister. Unable to reject the older sister for fear of a casus belli (an act to justify war) with Tamatoa III, he married both sisters around 1809. In some sources, the marriage is specifically dated to around 8 November 1811. Pōmare II preferred her younger sister, but Teriitaria was given the status of queen and the honorary title of Pōmare Vahine. Pōmare II's grandmother Tetupaia i Hauiri was also a scion of the Raiatea line making him second cousin of his two spouses.

British missionary John Davies described the circumstances of the marriage and how Teriitaria remained on Huahine and was not brought over to Tahiti and Moorea until 1814–1815.

Teriitaria's marriage with Pōmare II remained childless. Her sister Teremoemoe had three children with him including: Aimata (1813–1877), who ruled as Queen Pōmare IV from 1827 to 1877, Teinaiti (1817–1818), who died young, and Teriitaria (1820–1827), named after his aunt, who reigned as Pōmare III from 1821 to 1827. She was considered the adoptive mother of the young Pōmare III.

Battles for Christianity 
While in exile, Pōmare II began to rely more on the Christian missionaries, including two who had remained—James Hayward and Henry Nott. The rest of the missionaries had fled to New South Wales following the defeat of the Tahitian king in 1808 but were asked to return in 1811 by Pōmare II. The following year, he publicly announced his conversion to Christianity. Unlike his father, Pōmare II was not a warrior, and he left the active campaigning to his wives. Teriitaria supported her husband's armies in the reconquest of Tahiti and its eventual Christianization. Described as an Amazon queen, she was an energetic and courageous woman who personally led warriors into battle.

In May 1815, Teriitaria and Teremoemoe visited the district of Pare where Teremoemoe‘s daughter Aimata (born 1813) resided with her wet nurse. The native Christians (known as "Bure Atua" or Prayers of God) had re-established themselves in the district. The two women intended to tour Tahiti since it was Teriitaria's first time visiting the island. However, the Memoirs of Arii Taimai by Henry Adams later claimed they intended to proceed with "their arrangement for the overthrow of the native chiefs". The chiefs of Pare, Hapaiano, and Matavai, who were adherents of the traditional religion, formed an alliance with enemies of Pōmare including the chief of Atehuru and Opuhara, chief of Paparā and a member of the rival Teva clan. They plotted to destroy the royal party and massacre the recent converts. On the night of 7 July, Teriitaria and her party narrowly escaped the plot. They survived largely because either Opuhara or the chief of Atehuru refused to harm women. They fled by night in canoes back to Moorea.

In September 1815, the forces of Pōmare II returned to Pare on Tahiti to assert his paramountcy and reconquer the island from the traditionalists led by Opuhara. Teriitaria was at the head of the Christian warriors alongside Mahine, the king of Huahine and Maiao. The two opposing forces met on the shore in the vicinity of marae Utu'aimahurau (or Nari'i) in the district Pa'ea. The Battle of Te Feipī began on 11 November 1815. The fate of the battle was decided when Opuhara was killed in the fighting by Raveae, one of Mahine's men. The Pōmare faction won a decisive victory and restored their rule over Tahiti. British missionary William Ellis, who described the battle as "the most eventful day that had yet occurred in the history of Tahiti", gives a post-facto description of Mahine and Teriitaria preparing for the battle:

The Tahitians abandoned the old religion and converted en masse to Christianity following the battle. The king sanctioned a Tahitian iconoclasm, destroying the traditional foundation of the old religion for any remaining adherents. The marae temples were destroyed, the ti'i figures representing the traditional deities were burned and the construction of new churches commenced. He also sent a collection of his family gods to the London Missionary Society. Teriitaria and Teremoemoe were already converted to the new faith as well and were numbered among a list of recent converts in December 1814. In an 1817 letter to missionary John Eyre in Parramatta, Pōmare II wrote: "There is a great mortality this season. My wife Tarutaria is very ill. Perhaps she will die. The termination of life we know not. None but God knows. With him is life (or salvation.)" She survived the illness.

Pōmare II, who had professed the faith since 1812, was officially baptized on 16 July 1819 in the Royal Mission Chapel at Papaoa, Tahiti. He was the first Tahitian to receive a baptism. The remaining members of the royal family were baptized on 10 September 1820 at the Royal Mission Chapel at Papaoa in the presence of a thousand people. Teriitaria, the newborn son of Pōmare II, and Teremoemoe were baptized by missionary William Crook while the elder Teriitaria and Aimata were baptized by Nott. The sisters adopted the names Taaroavahine and Taaroamaiturai, respectively, although they do not seem to have regularly used these names. Despite the ceremony, Pōmare II, Aimata and the elder Teriitaria noticeably did not take part in the Lord’s Supper (Eucharist) because "they did not yet seem decidedly pious". By 1821, Teriitaria was deemed "more correct in her conducts, and more amiable in her manner" and allowed to take part in the Eucharist. In 1824, the LMS missionaries noted, "She is a member of the church at Papaete [sic], and is considered as a pious woman." However, both sisters were described as "excommunicated members of the church" in 1829 by American missionary Charles Samuel Stewart.

Regent of Tahiti 

After the death of Pōmare II in 1821, the younger Teriitaria succeeded as King Pōmare III of Tahiti. Being a minor, Pōmare III was placed under a regency council consisting of his aunt Teriitaria, his mother Teremoemoe and the five principal chiefs of Tahiti. The council was initially headed by Manaonao (or sometimes Paiti), a chief who took the name Ari'ipaea, with Teriitaria as co-regent. After Manaonao's death in 1823, Teriitaria assumed the head of the regency council. Some argued that Pōmare II intended to choose Tati, brother of the defeated Opuhara and the ruling chief of Paparā, as the regent and guardian for his son. Jacques-Antoine Moerenhout, the French consul in Tahiti, later claimed Pōmare II wanted Tati to succeed him. However, the decision was ignored by the British missionaries because of Tati's independent nature and the fear that he would establish his own dynasty. Pōmare III was crowned in a European style coronation ceremony on 21 April 1824 and raised and educated on the island of Moorea by the missionaries.

On 6 September 1826, Commodore Thomas ap Catesby Jones, while in command of the veteran sloop-of-war , signed a treaty with Queen regent Teriitaria and Pōmare III. The treaty established commercial relations between the United States and Tahiti. Thomas Elley, the British vice-consul for the Society Islands, and the resident British missionaries opposed this because the British had no formal treaties with Tahiti. Subsequently, the missionaries discouraged the Tahitian government from entering into treaties with other nations. The regency council remained in power until the death of the young monarch from dysentery in 1827. She continued ruling as regent for her niece Aimata who reigned as Pōmare IV. Her administration was seen as economically oppressive to the Europeans. She sought to monopolize the pearl trade like Pōmare II had attempted with the pork trade, and ignored acts of piracy in the Tuamotus (dependencies of the Tahitian crown). She fixed prices and wages and sent agents to oversee all aspects of foreign trades to the consternation of the Tahitians and foreign merchants. Because of these ineptitudes, she was replaced as regent on April 1828 by Tati. In the 1830s, she took the title and name of Ari'ipaea Vahine.

Despite her removal from the regency, she continued to hold considerable influence and power and stood second in rank to her niece. In February 1832, Teriitaria along with Tati and other chiefs led the forces of Queen Pōmare IV and suppressed a rebellion in Taiarapu (modern-day Taiarapu-Est and Taiarapu-Ouest) led by a local chief named Ta'aviri. The rebellion was supported by the Mamaia heresy, a 
millenarian movement which synchronized Christianity with traditional indigenous beliefs. The Mamaia movement prophesied a victory for the rebel forces. Teriitaria personally commanded her warriors with a sabre and pistol in her hand. The battle on 12 February resulted in a decisive defeat for the rebel forces and the eventual suppression of the Mamaia heresy.

Ruler of Huahine 

In 1815, Teriitaria became the nominal Queen of Huahine and Maiao. The previous ruler, Mahine, fought alongside her at the Battle of Te Feipī. Ellis stated that by the 1820s, Mahine had formally presented the government of the islands to her while he remained the resident chief until his death in 1838. She ruled largely as an absentee monarch while residing on Tahiti for the first few decades of her reign. Her later reign coincided with the Franco-Tahitian War. Pōmare IV was deposed in 1843 by French naval commander Abel Aubert du Petit-Thouars in an attempt to annex Tahiti. From 1844 to 1847, Teriitaria accompanied her niece into voluntary exile on Raiatea as a protest against the seizure of the Tahitian throne by the French.

In 1845 she defeated an attempt by the French to establish a protectorate over the remaining independent states of the Leeward Islands (Bora Bora, Raiatea and Huahine). With the support of two local chiefs named Haperoa and Teraimano, the French planted a French flag on Huahune soil and threatened to retaliate against anyone who tried to remove it. While on Raiatea, Teriitaria learned of the actions of her subordinate and rallied a force of Raiatean warriors and sailed for Huahine in a whaler. She assembled the people and had them chop the flagstaff down. She then pulled it out herself before sending the flag back to Armand Joseph Bruat, the French governor of Tahiti.

A renewed effort to conquer Huahine was made when Commandant Louis Adolphe Bonard was ordered to go to the island and make a show of force. On 17 January 1846, he landed 400 soldiers and marines at Fare harbour. During the Battle of Maeva, Territaria’s forces, supported by around 20 Europeans, held the French off for two days, killing 18 and wounding 43, before they abandoned the attempt and sailed away. Edward Lucett, a British merchant and an island shipowner, noted, "Old Ariipae, musket in hand, and with half a dozen cartouch [sic] boxes belted round her slender waist, was there to encourage her people". This decisive defeat lifted the French naval blockade of Raiatea and forced them to evacuate Bora Bora effectively liberating the Leeward Islands. The French returned to suppress the guerrilla war still waging on Tahiti.

Although Great Britain never intervened militarily, the British naval officer Henry Byam Martin and commander of HMS Grampus, was sent to the Society Islands to spy on the conflict. His account of the closing months of the conflict are recorded in The Polynesian Journal of Captain Henry Byam Martin, R.N. Marin had an audience with the aged warrior queen at Fare on 21 April 1847 where she told him that, "I would resist the French flag to the last." Below is an excerpt of Martin's impression of the queen:

Attempts to conquer the neighbouring kingdoms of the Leeward Islands ceased after the French withdrew their troops, but guerilla warfare continued between the French and Tahitians on Tahiti until 1846 when Fort Fautaua, the native stronghold, was captured by the French. In February 1847, Queen Pōmare IV returned from her exile and acquiesced to rule under the protectorate. Although victorious, the French were unable to annex the islands due to diplomatic pressure from Great Britain, so Tahiti and its dependency Moorea continued to be ruled under the French protectorate. The Jarnac Convention was also signed by France and Great Britain, in which the two powers agreed to respect the independence of Huahine, Raiatea, and Bora Bora.

Not trusting the French would not seek reprisal for their defeat on Huahine, Teriitaria refused to return to Papeete with her niece in 1847. She wrote a letter to Queen Victoria, dated 3 February 1847, asking her to protect the independence of the Leeward Islands. The traditional alliance of the chiefly families of the Society Islands have been termed the hau pahu rahi ("government of the great drum") or hau feti'i (“family government"). This alliance was severely tested when the French attempted to characterize it as evidence of Queen Pōmare IV's dominion over the rest of the islands. As a gesture to the enduring nature of the hau feti'i, Teriitaria adopted Queen Pōmare IV's second son Terātane as her heir to the throne of Huahine and named him Teriitaria. Instead of becoming the next king of Huahine, this boy would one day succeeded his mother as King Pōmare V. She was also the adoptive mother Ninito Teraʻiapo Sumner (died 1898), one of the granddaughters of Tati. Betrothed to Prince Moses Kekūāiwa, she arrived in Hawaii after his death from measles in 1848 and later married into the prominent Sumner family on Hawaii.

Deposition 

In either 1852 or 1854, she was deposed of her rule over Huahine. The succession becomes confusing at this point in history, and historians have found the exact details of the transition of power hard to piece together.

A civil war broke out on October 1852 on Huahine. This event was preceded by an incident in 1850 when her followers destroyed the cargo and plantation of European trader John Brander for refusing to pay port dues. A commission of French, American, and British officials forced the queen to pay a restitution of $287, which were collected from all the districts of Huahine. She was deposed by Mahine's grandson Ari'imate (1824–1874), and in 1853 she unsuccessfully attempted to restore herself by allying with the French commander in Tahiti. In the contemporary Messager de Tahiti, a state-run publication of the French protectorate in Papeete, Teriitaria was overthrown after a violent battle with Ari'imate on 18 March 1854. This source does not mention any relation between the two individuals.
Writing between 1852 and 1860, French naval physician Gilbert Henri Cuzent noted: "Terii-Taria, vieille reine de Huahine qui, restée sans postérité, a été détrônée il n'y a pas encore longtemps pour faire place à un de ses neveux." or "Terii-Taria, old queen of Huahine who, left without posterity, was dethroned not long ago to make room for one of her nephews." Ari'imate married her paternal niece who later reigned in her own right as Tehaʻapapa II in 1868.

In the Histoire de Huahine et autres îles Sous-le-Vent written by Father Joseph Chesneau from 1907 to 1914 in collaboration with Pascal Marcantoni, an alternative history of Huahine is given. Teriitaria's reign ends before the Franco-Tahitian War and her immediate successor is named Queen Teuhe I (wife of Mahine's son Taaroarii), and Chesneau names her as the queen who fought the French at Maeva. According to this alternative historical account, Teuhe I was followed by Ma'ihara Temari'i (1822–1877), who also reigned under the name of Teriitaria (adding more confusion) and this Teriitaria was deposed by her brother Ari'imate on 18 March 1854.

According to the resident British missionary John Barff, Teriʻitaria's deposition was rooted in the erosion of the traditional power of the ariʻi class and the civil unrest of the ra'atira class of freemen. They objected to "the encroachment of the supreme chiefs upon the powers of the district governors and the insecurity to property resulting from the continuance of the old practice in which the chiefs indulged of taking food from the plantation of their subjects whenever they chose to."

Teriitaria died at Papeete in 1858, at the royal palace in the presence of her sister and her niece.

Family tree

See also 
List of monarchs of Huahine
List of consorts of Tahiti

Notes

References

Citations

Sources

Further reading 

1790 births
1858 deaths
19th-century women rulers
Huahine royalty
Queens regnant in Oceania
Pōmare dynasty
Converts to Protestantism from pagan religions
Protestant monarchs
19th-century monarchs in Oceania
Women in 19th-century warfare
Women in war in Oceania
French Polynesian Protestants
Tahitian women